Blata l-Bajda is a suburb in Ħamrun, Malta, on the way to Valletta.

Notable buildings include the chapel dedicated to Our Lady of the Miraculous Medal and St. Joseph School, a school run by the Sisters of St. Joseph of the Apparition. The Spencer Monument is also found in this suburb.

Maria Regina Girls Junior Lyceum can be found in Blata l-Bajda. This school caters to over 1000 students coming from central Malta.

See also 

 Spencer Monument

Towns in Malta
Ħamrun